Lubritorium is the fourth release and second full-length album by Hullabaloo. It was released in 1991 on C/Z Records.

Lubritorium was recorded after an aborted tour that took them through some apparently tough times in Canada—as evidenced by their song "Blow me Fucking Canada." The band returns to a quartet format here, with Sluggo on bass and John back behind the drum kit. This was the final appearance of Sluggo in the band before moving to San Francisco, though he is rejoining the band for a reunion in 2014.

This record features five new original songs, plus re-recordings of three older songs. The older songs had remained in their live repertoire over the years; the new versions represent the evolution of the songs through the changing lineups. There is a reggae cover of Kiss's Calling Dr. Love; the band had previously released a straight version of the song on C/Z's Hard to Believe: Kiss Covers Compilation. The record also has three tracks marked "Filler #1-3"; see notes below.

This is the third of their records recorded at the legendary Fort Apache Studios, this time with Lou Giordano behind the controls instead of Paul Kolderie.

The cover art is a painting by Slaughter Shack singer and artist Colin Burns.

Track listing

Notes
† Filler #1 is an uncredited excerpt from the movie Harold and Maude.
‡ Filler #2 and #3 are excerpts from a live recording at WBRS in April 1990, engineered by Hillel Cooperman and Wendy Shlensky.

Personnel
The Hullabaloo Show
Funkmaster Jam - Vocals, Trumpet
DJ Kevy Kev - Guitars, B. Vocals
Jammaster Funk - Drums, B. Vocals
E=MC Squared - Bass, B. Vocals
Over E-Z - Roadie, Makeup
Technical Personnel
Lou Giordano - Engineer
Colin Burns - Painting

References

External links

1991 albums
Hullabaloo (band) albums
C/Z Records albums